HMPNGS Rabaul (01) was the first Pacific Forum patrol vessel to be commissioned, in May 1987.  She is not the first vessel of the class to go out of service, because her sister ship from Fiji  was wrecked in 2016.  She arrived in Port Moresby, for disposal, on October 24, 2018.  The vessel was named HMPNGS Tarangau.

Australia gave Papua New Guinea four vessels, and gave an additional eighteen vessels to neighboring countries in the Pacific Forum.  Australia gave these vessels to her smaller neighbors after the United Nations Convention of the Laws of the Sea established that maritime nations had  exclusive economic zone.  Australia gave these vessels so its neighbours could police their own sovereignty.

Design

Australia designed the vessels using commercial off-the-shelf technology, so small countries would find them easier to maintain, in small remote shipyards.  Australia fully equipped the ships, prior to delivery, with the exception of providing armament, but they are capable of mounting an autocannon on the foredeck.

Operational history

Rabaul and her sister ships played a role in the Bougainville conflict.

Replacement

Australia started building a new, larger, and more capable class of patrol vessels, to replace the Pacific Forum class.

References

Pacific Forum class patrol vessels
Patrol vessels of the Papua New Guinea Defence Force
1987 ships